Thetonium or Thetonion, also Theton (Θητών), was a town and polis of Thessaliotis in ancient Thessaly.

The town in mentioned in an inscription dated between 450-425 BCE that is the oldest writing where the title of tagus of Thessaly is mentioned. It is an honorary decree for a certain Soter of Corinth. The acting tagus of Thetonium would be responsible for compliance with the conditions of this decree. In the same text it also appears that Thetonium had a ὑλωρός, which was a post that had surveillance functions in rural areas.

It site is located at a site called Kypritsi near modern Gefiria.

References

Populated places in ancient Thessaly
Former populated places in Greece
Thessaliotis
Thessalian city-states